Object-Oriented Graphics Rendering Engine (OGRE) is a scene-oriented, real-time, open-source, 3D rendering engine.

Ogre has been ported to Windows, macOS, Linux, PocketPC, Xbox, and PS3.

Since 2019, Ogre consists of two forks developed separately, namely Ogre (also called Ogre1), which is based on the original 1.x codebase and Ogre Next (also called Ogre2), which is based on the 2.x development efforts.

Games and applications 
 Gazebo simulator and Ignition Gazebo
 Hob
 OpenMW (until v0.37.0)
 Rebel Galaxy
 Rebel Galaxy Outlaw
 Rigs of Rods
 Roblox (until 2014)
 Running with Rifles
 Scrap Mechanic (until 2016)
 Shadows: Heretic Kingdoms
 TROUBLESHOOTER: Abandoned Children
 Torchlight & Torchlight II
 Walaber's Trampoline
 Zombie Driver
 Kenshi

References

External links

 
 

2005 software
3D scenegraph APIs
Free 3D graphics software
Free software programmed in C++
Video game development software